Nemenman is a surname. Notable people with this surname include:

 Ilya Nemenman  ( 1975), American theoretical physicist
 Mark Nemenman  ( 1936), Soviet computer scientist

Jewish surnames
Yiddish-language_surnames